Tacca ankaranensis is a species of flowering plant in the yam family Dioscoreaceae, which is endemic to Madagascar. It was discovered on the Ankarana massif in far northern Madagascar.

It was first described in 1997 by Martine Bardot-Vaucoulon.

References

Dioscoreaceae
Root vegetables
Endemic flora of Madagascar
Plants described in 1997